Pay Taq (also Romanized as Pāy Ţāq; also known as Pā-ye Takht and Pa yi Takht) is a village in Hanza Rural District, Hanza District, Rabor County, Kerman Province, Iran. At the 2006 census, its population was 22, in 5 families.

References 

Populated places in Rabor County